Patricia Coogan is Senior Epidemiologist at the Slone Epidemiology Center and a Boston University School of Public Health (BUSPH) Research Professor in the Department of Epidemiology. She is a co-nvestigator for the Black Women’s Health Study (BWHS), a prospective study at the Slone Epidemiology Center.

Biography

Education

 Boston University, DSc Epidemiology
Boston University, MPH Environmental Health
University of Cincinnati, BA Urban Studies

Career
Her research interests focus on “environmental influences on health outcomes including cancer, obesity, and physical activity.

Coogan has received research grants from the National Institutes of Health including one to study air pollution and risk of incident hypertension and diabetes in African American women. It is a five year grant from the National Institute of Environmental Health Sciences.  Another is a three year study funded by the National Heart, Lung, and Blood Institute to study the incidence of asthma in African American women.

Select publications
 Wesselink AK, Rosenberg L, Wise LA, Jerrett M, Coogan PF. A prospective cohort study of ambient air pollution exposure and risk of uterine leiomyomata. Hum Reprod. 2021 07 19; 36(8):2321-2330. PMID: 33984861.
 Coogan PF, Rosenberg L, Palmer JR, Cozier YC, Lenzy YM, Bertrand KA. Hair product use and breast cancer incidence in the Black Women's Health Study. Carcinogenesis. 2021 07 16; 42(7):924-930. PMID: 34013957.
 White AJ, Gregoire AM, Niehoff NM, Bertrand KA, Palmer JR, Coogan PF, Bethea TN. Air pollution and breast cancer risk in the Black Women's Health Study. Environ Res. 2021 03; 194:110651. PMID: 33387538.
When Worlds Collide: Observations on the Integration of Epidemiology and Transportation Behavioral Analysis in the Study of Walking
 Boston University Medical Center. "Depressive symptoms linked to adult-onset asthma in African-American women." ScienceDaily. ScienceDaily, 21 January 2014.

References

External links
Patricia F Coogan, ResearchGate

University of Cincinnati alumni
Boston University School of Public Health alumni
Boston University School of Public Health faculty
Living people
American women epidemiologists
Year of birth missing (living people)
American epidemiologists
Place of birth missing (living people)